Disposition index (DI) is the product of insulin sensitivity times the amount of insulin secreted in response to blood glucose levels. Insulin resistant individuals can maintain normal responses to blood glucose due to the fact that higher levels of insulin are secreted as long as the beta cells of the pancreas are able to increase their output of insulin to compensate for the insulin resistance. But the ratio of the incremental increase in plasma insulin associated with an incremental increase in plasma glucose (disposition index) provides a better measure of beta cell function than the plasma insulin response to a glucose challenge. Loss of function of the beta cells, reducing their capacity to compensate for insulin resistance, results in a lower disposition index.

Disposition index is used as a measure of beta cell function and the ability of the body to dispose of a glucose load. Thus a lowering of disposition index predicts the conversion of insulin resistance to diabetes mellitus type 2.
Disposition index, but not insulin resistance, can predict type 2 diabetes in persons with normal blood glucose levels, but who do not have a family history (genetic predisposition) to type 2 diabetes.

Disposition index can be increased by aerobic exercise, but only to the extent that insulin sensitivity is improved.

References

Diabetes-related tests
Static endocrine function tests